Ingeberg is a village in Hamar Municipality in Innlandet county, Norway. The first document mentioning the village is dated 1339 and is in the state archives at Hamar.

References

Hamar
Villages in Innlandet